Anquetil is a Norman surname, former first name, from Old Norse Ásketill, combination of as "god" (see ōs) and ketill "cauldron" (see kettle).

Anquetil may refer to:

Abraham Hyacinthe Anquetil-Duperron (1731–1805), French orientalist, brother of historian Louis-Pierre Anquetil
Emmanuel Anquetil, unionist and second leader of the Mauritius Labour Party
Jacques Anquetil (1934–1987), French road racing cyclist
Louis-Pierre Anquetil (1723–1808), French historian
Grégory Anquetil (1970-), French handball player

Other forms and similar names 
Anctil
Anketell (disambiguation)

External links 

Surnames of Norman origin